Bucknall and Northwood railway station was opened by the North Staffordshire Railway in 1864 to serve the Bucknall area of Stoke-on-Trent. Passenger services on the Biddulph line ceased in 1927, but services on the Leek line continued until May 1956. After this date the station was still used for special and excursion trains until complete closure in 1962.

The line to Leek remained in use (as far as Leekbrook) until 1988 and the track remains in place and it is planned for the line to reopen under plans put forward by Moorland & City Railways.

References
Notes

Sources

Disused railway stations in Stoke-on-Trent
Former North Staffordshire Railway stations
Railway stations in Great Britain opened in 1864
Railway stations in Great Britain closed in 1956